Ukraine's 3rd electoral district is a Verkhovna Rada constituency in the Autonomous Republic of Crimea. Established in its current form in 2012, it contains the city of Dzhankoi and the surrounding regions of Dzhankoi Raion and Krasnohvardiiske Raion. The constituency is home to 160,311 registered voters, and has 164 polling stations. Since the Annexation of Crimea by the Russian Federation in 2014, the seat has been vacant.

Members of Parliament

Elections

2012

See also
Electoral districts of Ukraine
Foreign electoral district of Ukraine

References

Electoral districts of Ukraine
Constituencies established in 2012